Judge Sabin

Chauncey Brewer Sabin (1824–1890), judge of the United States District Court for the Eastern District of Texas
George Myron Sabin (1834–1890), judge of the United States District Court for the District of Nevada